Katusha Demidova is a Russian professional ballroom dancer and instructor, now residing in the USA. She is the 2009, 2010, 2011, 2012, 2013, 2014, 2015, 2016, 2017, 2018 Professional World Ballroom Dance Champion, and also the International Professional, and British Open, Ballroom Champion. Her partner in these events was Arunas Bizokas. She is the sister of Anna Demidova who is also a dancer.

Demidova previously danced with Jonathan Wilkins, who came second in the 2009 World event with Hazel Newberry. The Wilkins–Demidova partnership lasted from 1996 to 2007, culminating in a first-place finish in the USA Open Professional Standard. Demidova has with partners Wilkins and Bizokas held the U.S. National Professional Standard Championship title continuously since 1998.

References

External links
Arunas & Katusha Website

Russian ballroom dancers
Russian female dancers
Living people
21st-century Russian dancers
Year of birth missing (living people)